György Nonn (9 January 1918 – 17 November 2007) was a Hungarian jurist, who served as Chief Prosecutor of Hungary from 1955 to 1956.

References
 Biography
 Országgyűlési Almanach (1947–1949)

1918 births
2007 deaths
People from Satu Mare County
Hungarian Communist Party politicians
Members of the Hungarian Working People's Party
Hungarian jurists